Wachsenburg Castle  is a castle in Amt Wachsenburg in the Ilm-Kreis, Thuringia, Germany. It is one of the Drei Gleichen, three hilltop castles east of Gotha. It was originally built in the 10th century. The castle was extensively reconstructed in the 17th and 19th century. The well-preserved castle (most recently restored in the 1990s) now houses a museum, a hotel and a restaurant.

It was built by Hersfeld Monastery. During its history, Wachsenburg Castle has had its fair share of troubles. In  a notorious robber baron took control of the castle and made it his base for his raids on the merchants of Erfurt.

References

External links
 Veste Wachenburg

Castles in Thuringia
Buildings and structures in Ilm-Kreis